Eshkaft-e Siah or Eshkaft Siah or Eshkoft-e Siah may refer to:
 Eshkaft-e Siah, Hormozgan
 Eshkaft Siah, Boyer-Ahmad, Kohgiluyeh and Boyer-Ahmad Province
 Eshkaft Siah, Charam, Kohgiluyeh and Boyer-Ahmad Province